Comanche County–City Airport  is a public use airport located two nautical miles (2.3 mi, 3.7 km) northeast of the central business district of Comanche, a city in Comanche County, Texas, United States. It is owned by the City of Comanche and Comanche County. The airport is included in the FAA's National Plan of Integrated Airport Systems for 2011–2015, which categorized it as a general aviation facility.

Although many U.S. airports use the same three-letter location identifier for the FAA and IATA, this facility is assigned MKN by the FAA but has no designation from the IATA (which assigned MKN to Malekolon, Papua New Guinea).

Facilities and aircraft 
It has one runway designated 17/35 with an asphalt surface measuring 4,500 by 75 feet (1,372 x 23 m).

For the 12-month period ending August 6, 2008, the airport had 6,300 general aviation aircraft operations, an average of 17 per day. At that time there were 20 aircraft based at this airport: 85% single-engine, 5% multi-engine, and 10% helicopter.

References

External links 
  at Texas DOT Airport Directory
 Aerial image as of January 1995 from USGS The National Map
 

Airports in Texas
Buildings and structures in Comanche County, Texas
Transportation in Comanche County, Texas